The American Land Title Association (ALTA), founded in 1907, is the national trade association representing more than 6,400 title insurance companies, title and settlement agents, independent abstracters, title searchers and real estate attorneys. ALTA's headquarters is located in Washington, D.C. ALTA founded the Coalition to Stop Real Estate Wire Fraud in 2019.

Overview 
ALTA members conduct title searches, examinations, closings and issue title insurance that protects real property owners and mortgage lenders against losses from defects in titles.

Governance 
The 11-member ALTA Board of Governors is responsible for creating association strategic priorities, managing the financial health of the association and overseeing the work of more than 40 committees.

References

External links
 Official website
 Consumer education website

Trade associations based in the United States
Surveying organizations
Geographic data and information organizations in the United States
Organizations established in 1907
1907 establishments in the United States